The River Jordan is a short river in the East Midlands of England. It is a tributary of the River Welland.

Course
It rises to the north-west of Desborough in Northamptonshire before flowing through Braybrooke and into Leicestershire at Little Bowden within Market Harborough before joining the River Welland at Rockingham Road, Market Harborough, close to the railway station and bridge.

Status
In 2019, the overall classification of the River Jordan was 'Bad' under the Water Framework Directive for reasons of poor livestock, soil and nutrient management in the agricultural land surrounding it, enrichment from treated sewage effluent and physical modification for land drainage.

References

External links 
 Image and Blog entry -  River Jordan, Little Bowden
Discussion of the name, also on the Liberal England blog

Rivers of Northamptonshire
Rivers of Leicestershire